"Wake Up Irene" is a parody song written by Johnny Hathcock and Weldon Allard, performed by Hank Thompson and His Brazos Valley Boys, and released in 1954 on the Capitol label (catalog no. 21226). 

It was a parody of, and answer song to, "Goodnight, Irene". A recording by The Weavers of Goodnight, Irene was released in 1950 and spent 13 weeks at No. 1 on the United States pop chart.

The premise of Wake Up, Irene is that Irene was prevented from sleep by the steel guitars and everyone around the country singing goodnight to her for months and months. According to the song, Irene finally fell asleep, and there's not a thing that can wake her.

In May 1954, the song peaked at No. 2 on the Billboard country and western chart. It was also ranked No. 17 on Billboards 1954 year-end country and western retail chart.

See also
 Billboard Top Country & Western Records of 1954

References

Hank Thompson (musician) songs
1954 songs
Answer songs
Musical parodies